Bilateral relations exist between Australia and Saudi Arabia. Australia has an embassy in Riyadh and a consulate in Jeddah; and Saudi Arabia has an embassy in Canberra and a consulate in Sydney. The two countries are members of G20.

History
Australia and Saudi Arabia established relations following the end of World War II.

Saudi Arabia and Australia were part of the joint-alliance with the United States during the Cold War, as both were strongly anti-communist and hostile to the Soviet Union. Once the Cold War came to an end, Saudi Arabia and Australia increased their cooperation.

Saudi Arabia, along with the United Arab Emirates, is Australia's major market partner in the Middle East.

With Saudi Arabia announced Saudi Vision 2030, Australia was viewed highly for its contribution to the vision development.

In 2016, it was reported that Saudi embassy staff in Canberra overspeed and do not pay their fines.

In 2018, after Jamal Khashoggi was assassinated, the Australian government condemned the Saudi authorities and stated that Australian diplomats would not be attending an international event later that year.

2018 World Cup qualifying controversy
During the 2018 FIFA World Cup qualification – AFC Third Round, Australia faced up Saudi Arabia in an important game over 2018 FIFA World Cup in Adelaide. The match happened after the deadly Manchester Arena bombing killing 23 people and two sides were informed to make one-minute silence; however the Saudi team, instead of observing one minute, disrespected the local populace by taking on the ground. This has caused uproar that Saudis did not demonstrate respect for the population and that Saudis did not respect the deaths despite Saudi explanation that it wasn't part of Saudi culture, given how they already observed silence for the Qatar Airways Cup match between Al-Ahli Saudi FC and FC Barcelona a year earlier. The Saudi officials later apologized for the misdeed and claimed to correct the mistakes. Australia won the game 3–2 but only managed to qualify for World Cup throughout playoffs while Saudi Arabia managed to become one of four Asian teams to qualify first.

Economic relations
In 2021, the two-way goods and services trade totalled $2.93 billion. Saudi Arabia is a substantial market for beef, sheep meat, barley, wheat, dairy products, cosmetics, pharmaceuticals, vehicle parts and accessories and vegetables.

Education
A large number of Saudi tertiary students study in Australia, mostly under the King Salman Scholarship Program. In 2019, there were more than 6,200 Saudi students studying in Australian educational institutions, representing the largest cohort from the Middle East region.

Diaspora

At the time of the 2016 Australian census, there were over 12,000 Saudi Arabians living in Australia.

Saudi Arabians living in Australia tend to have a higher median income compared to other migrant populations and the average Australian-born population. They are predominantly young (majority being under the age of 30).

Opinion polls
In 2020, Saudi Arabia was the most negatively perceived country by Australians according to a 2020 poll by the Lowy Institute, scoring only a 32% positivity rating.

See also
Foreign relations of Australia
Foreign relations of Saudi Arabia

References

External links
Australian Embassy, Saudi Arabia
Embassy of the Kingdom of Saudi Arabia in Australia

 
Australia
Saudi Arabia